The 1963–64 Fenn College Foxes men's basketball team represented Fenn College in the 1963–64 college basketball season. They participated in the NCAA College Division. The team was led by fifth-year head coach Jim Rodriguez. In 1962–63, the Foxes finished 9–9. All home games were played at Cathedral Latin High School except for two games. Those two games were on February 11, 1964, and February 19, 1964, and played at St. Stanislaus High School. The 10–9 season marked the first winning season for Fenn College since the 1949–50 season. It was also only the third winning season in school history. It was the 33rd season of Cleveland State basketball.

Schedule 

Cleveland State Vikings men's basketball seasons
Fenn College Foxes
Cleveland State
Cleveland State